Reece Williams (born 16 November 1988) is a South African cricketer. He made his first-class debut for Northern Cape in the 2007–08 Sunfoil 3-Day Cup on 14 February 2008. He made his List A debut for Northern Cape in the 2007–08 CSA Provincial One-Day Challenge on 17 February 2008.

References

External links
 

1988 births
Living people
South African cricketers
Eastern Province cricketers
Northern Cape cricketers
Place of birth missing (living people)